Thomas Liam McNamara (born February 6, 1991) is an American professional soccer player who plays as a midfielder for Major League Soccer club New England Revolution.

Career

Early career
Thomas McNamara was born in West Nyack,  NY.  McNamara played high school soccer at Don Bosco Prep in Ramsey, NJ, and played club soccer for FC Westchester. McNamara played college soccer at Brown University for four years before spending a fifth year playing college soccer for Clemson University in 2013. He was a First Team All-Ivy selection as a senior and finished his career at Brown with 12 goals and 10 assists. He scored seven goals while recording eight assists in his final season of college soccer at Clemson. He is only the second Clemson soccer player to be named an All-American both on and off the field in the same season. In 2013, he was named Second Team All-American by the NSCAA and a First Team Academic All-American. McNamara is the first Clemson soccer player selected to the Capital One Academic First Team since 1987 when Jamey Rootes was selected. Rootes is currently the President of the NFL's Houston Texans.He also played in the USL PDL with the Jersey Express in 2013.

Chivas USA
McNamara was drafted first in the second round of the 2014 MLS SuperDraft by Chivas USA, and was officially signed on February 14, 2014. He made his professional debut for the team on March 9, 2014 against the Chicago Fire in which he also scored his first professional goal in the 60th minute on the way to a 3–2 opening day victory. On April 12, McNamara tore the ACL in his right knee, requiring him to undergo surgery to repair his ACL.

New York City FC
After the contraction of Chivas USA following the 2014 Major League Soccer season, McNamara was selected by D.C. United in the 2014 MLS Dispersal Draft. Leading up to the 2015 Expansion of Major League Soccer Draft, McNamara was left unprotected by D.C. United. New York City FC selected him with their eighth pick in the 2014 MLS Expansion Draft.

McNamara scored his first goal for New York City FC on June 6, 2015 against the Philadelphia Union. The goal, scored from about 25 yards out, was awarded MLS goal of the week honors. This right-footed curling shot into the top corner has become a signature of McNamara's, as he has scored near identical goals from similar areas of the pitch against Chicago Fire, Portland Timbers New York Red Bulls, and Colorado Rapids.

Houston Dynamo
McNamara was selected by Houston Dynamo in the second-round of the 2018 MLS Re-Entry Draft on December 20, 2018. He signed with the Dynamo on January 11, 2019  He made his Dynamo debut on February 19, coming on as a substitute in a 1–0 win over C.D. Guastatoya in a CONCACAF Champions League match.  McNamara scored his first goal for Houston on May 18 in a 2–1 win over D.C. United.  On July 20, he scored a goal and had an assist as the Dynamo defeated Toronto FC 3–1.  McNamara would return to NYCFC on August 8 and would mark the occasion by picking up his second assist of the season.  However, the Dynamo would lose by a score of 3–2. McNamara would lead the team with 39 appearances across all competitions, and finished the year with 2 goals and 3 assists.  It was a poor season for Houston as a team, finishing 10th in the Western Conference and missing out on the playoffs.

McNamara started the first two games of the 2020 season before the season was paused due to the COVID-19 pandemic.  The league returned to play in July with the MLS is Back Tournament, where McNamara made a substitute appearance in 2 of Houston's 3 games.

New England Revolution
On August 17, 2020, McNamara acquired by New England via trade with Houston on Aug. 17, 2020.  He re-signed with the Revolution on December 22.

International career

McNamara is an American and Irish passport holder, as his paternal grandfather was born in Ireland. He has expressed interest in playing for either national team.

Career statistics

Honors
New England Revolution
Supporters' Shield: 2021

Individual
NYCFC Etihad Player of the month June 2015
NYCFC Etihad Player of the month March 2016
Major League Soccer Goal of the Week: 2015 Week 14 
Major League Soccer Goal of the Week: 2016 Week 4

References

External links
 
 Profile at NYCFC
 

1991 births
Living people
American soccer players
Association football midfielders
Brown Bears men's soccer players
Chivas USA draft picks
Chivas USA players
Clemson Tigers men's soccer players
Don Bosco Preparatory High School alumni
Houston Dynamo FC players
Jersey Express S.C. players
Major League Soccer players
New England Revolution players
New York City FC players
People from West Nyack, New York
Soccer players from New York (state)
Sportspeople from the New York metropolitan area
USL Championship players
USL League Two players
Western Mass Pioneers players
Wilmington Hammerheads FC players
Worcester Hydra players